Whittlesea Secondary College is located in the township of Whittlesea, Victoria, Australia. It is set on the grounds of the former Whittlesea Technical High School, a link maintained today in the school's array of subjects including science, automotive repair, woodworking, metalworking, sewing and home economics. The school recently opened its new sports and performance center.

Secondary schools in Melbourne
Buildings and structures in the City of Whittlesea